Mick Molloy (born 13 March 1938) is an Irish long-distance runner. He competed in the marathon at the 1968 Summer Olympics.

References

1938 births
Living people
Athletes (track and field) at the 1968 Summer Olympics
Irish male long-distance runners
Irish male marathon runners
Olympic athletes of Ireland
Sportspeople from County Galway